= Dubbanamardi =

- Village
- Interactive map of Dubbanamardi
- Coordinates: 15.5761°N 74.9030°E
- Country: India
- State: Karnataka
- District: Dharwad

Government
  - Type: Panchayat raj
  - Body: Gram panchayat

Population (2011)
  - Total: 594

Languages
  - Official: Kannada
- Time zone: UTC+5:30 (IST)
- ISO 3166 code: IN-KA
- Vehicle registration: KA
- Website: karnataka.gov.in

Dubbanamardi is a village in Dharwad district of Karnataka, India.

== Demographics ==
As of the 2011 Census of India, there were 139 households in Dubbanamardi with a total population of 594 (310 males and 284 females); of these, 110 were children ages 0-6.
